Earl is a surname, and may refer to:

 Acie Earl, former American basketball player
 George Earl (disambiguation), multiple people
 Glenn Earl
 Harley Earl
 Holly Earl, English actress
 Jessie Earl (died 1980), English female murder victim
 Jimmy Earl, musician
 Josh Earl, English footballer
 Kate Earl, American singer-songwriter
 Maud Earl (1864-1943), English/American Dog painter
 Oren R. Earl (1813–1901), New York assemblyman
 Ralph Earl (1751–1801), American painter
 Robert Earl (disambiguation), several people
 Roger Earl
 Ronnie Earl
 Russell Earl, special effects artist
 Sam Earl (1915–2000), English professional footballer
 Tony Earl (1936-2023), American politician

See also
 Earl
 Earle (disambiguation)
 Earll
 Board of Education v. Earls

Occupational surnames
English-language surnames
English-language occupational surnames